James Hallinan may refer to:
 Jimmy Hallinan, Irish-American baseball player
 James T. Hallinan, American lawyer and judge from New York